Northia can refer to:

Taxonomy
Northia (gastropod), a genus of sea snails in the family Nassariidae
Northia (plant), a genus of plants in the family Sapotaceae